Darren Hare (born 2 April 1967) is an English football coach and former player, who is first team coach at Faversham Town.

Career
Born in Canterbury, he began his career playing for the youth teams of Dover and Gillingham and went on to play for a number of Kent-based non-league teams, including Ashford Town (where he was club leading scorer for two seasons), Thanet United, Canterbury City, Herne Bay and Sittingbourne. He also managed Canterbury and Folkestone Invicta, and worked as Youth Development Officer for the Kent County Football Association.

Hare later became Head of Youth Development for Gillingham.  In December 2004 he served as acting manager after the resignation of both Andy Hessenthaler and caretaker manager John Gorman. The following year he left Priestfield Stadium to become Head of Education and Welfare in the academy system at Crystal Palace, and made a brief playing comeback at the age of 38.

In 2007, he joined Dover Athletic as assistant to Hessenthaler, the club's new manager, who is also his brother-in-law. When Hessenthaler began his second period as manager at Gillingham in May 2010, Hare also returned to Priestfield, as youth team manager.

Hare was appointed as manager of Hastings United of the Isthmian League South Division in May 2016. He led the side to the play-offs during his one season in charge, but Hasings were defeated by Dorking Wanderers in the semi-finals on penalties following a 1–1 draw. He resigned from the role in May 2017, citing a desire to concentrate on his family and business interests.

In October 2018 he rejoined Dover and Andy Hessenthaler, taking on the position of joint first team coach. In November 2020, Hare resigned from his position due to personal reasons.

On 29 November 2022, Hare was appointed first team coach of Isthmian League South East Division club Faversham Town to new manager Sammy Moore.

Personal life
Hare is married to Alison, a nurse, and has three children, Josh, Chloe and James. Josh is a footballer who as of 2022 plays professionally for Dagenham & Redbridge.

References

1967 births
Living people
English footballers
Sportspeople from Canterbury
Footballers from Kent
Association football forwards
Dover Athletic F.C. players
Ebbsfleet United F.C. players
Ashford United F.C. players
Margate F.C. players
Canterbury City F.C. players
Hastings United F.C. players
Folkestone Invicta F.C. players
Herne Bay F.C. players
Sittingbourne F.C. players
English football managers
Canterbury City F.C. managers
Folkestone Invicta F.C. managers
Gillingham F.C. managers
Hastings United F.C. managers
English Football League players